Snit or SNIT may refer to:


Arts and entertainment
 Branwell F. Snit, character in a comic strip created by Morgan Sanders
 Snit Mandolin, main character in the 2009 Canadian film Hungry Hills
 Droopy "Snit" McCool, a minor character in the film Return of the Jedi
 Snit (mascot), a robotic character on Canadian TV channel YTV
 Šnit, a 2007 Igor Marojević novel
 Snits, creatures in the board game Snit's Revenge

Other uses
 Snit, nickname of Atlanta Braves manager Brian Snitker
 Snit (horse), a Thoroughbred horse which won the 1997 Cotillion Handicap
 National System of Land Information or Sistema Nacional de Información Territorial (SNIT), government entity in Chile participating in GeoSUR
 Shree Narayan Institute of Technology (SNIT), a college in Khargone, India
 Snit, an object-oriented extension to the Tcl programming language
 Snit, a unit of measurement for alcoholic drinks
 Snit, Jamaican name for the fish Haemulon vittatum
 Snits, West Frisian name for the Dutch city Sneek

See also 
 The Big Snit, a 1985 Canadian animated cartoon
 Moskva šnit, a popular fruitcake created by Hotel Moskva in Belgrade, Serbia